Events from the year 1692 in France.

Incumbents 
Monarch: Louis XIV

Events
 Battle of Barfleur (29 May) was a decisive battle in the British Nine Years' War

Births
 

 
 5 April – Adrienne Lecouvreur, French actress (d. 1730)
 6 November – Louis Racine, French poet (d. 1763)

Deaths
 

 23 July – Gilles Ménage, French scholar (b. 1613)
 6 November – Gédéon Tallemant des Réaux, French writer (b. 1619)

See also

References

1690s in France